The Master of the Regular Canons' Altarpiece was a German painter, active in the area around Erfurt during the fifteenth century.  He is named for an altarpiece painted for the church of the regular canons in Erfurt, dated to between 1450 and 1460; in addition one of his works is held by the Alte Pinakothek in Munich.

15th-century German painters
Regular Canons' Altarpiece, Master of the